IUC may refer to:

International Union of Crystallography, founded in 1948
International University College of Turin, a university located in Torino, Italy
International University of Chabahar, a university located in Chabahar, Iran
Inter-University Center for Japanese Language Studies, a Japanese language school located in Yokohama, Japan
 IntraUterine Contraceptive, a hormonal contraceptive